Euphorbia serrata is a species of spurge known by the common names serrated spurge and sawtooth spurge. It is native to Europe but it is present elsewhere as a weedy introduced species. This is a perennial herb growing anywhere from 20 centimetres to about half a metre in height. The leaves are long and very narrow on most of the plant, with more oval-shaped leaves toward the tips of the stems. They are finely toothed. At the ends of the branches are inflorescences of tiny flowers. The fruit is a spherical capsule about half a centimetre wide containing tiny gray seeds.

References

External links
Photo gallery

serrata
Plants described in 1753
Taxa named by Carl Linnaeus